Gurneyville may refer to:

Gurneyville, Alberta, an unincorporated community
Gurneyville, Ohio, an unincorporated community, in Clinton County